White Shroud Poems: 1980–1985 is a book of poetry by American writer Allen Ginsberg published in 1986.

See also 
 Jack Kerouac School of Disembodied Poetics
 Milarepa

External links
 Online Interview

Poetry by Allen Ginsberg
Beat poetry
American poetry collections
1986 poetry books
Harper & Row books